The Truth is the debut album by rapper Beanie Sigel. It was released on February 29, 2000, to critical and commercial success. The album sold 155,000 copies in its first week released. It reached #5 on The Billboard 200 and had 1 charting remotely popular single: "Anything". Beanie Sigel and his debut album were intensely hyped up after "a few dazzling collaborations" according to Matt Conaway of Allmusic and Conaway says that it "is the culmination of that promise".

This album is known for being the first Roc-A-Fella release to introduce Just Blaze and Kanye West, both who would later become primary producers for artists in the label. "The Truth" is currently used as the entrance music for independent professional wrestler Nelson Erazo, better known as Homicide. "What a Thug About" appeared in the video game Saints Row 2 on the fictional hip hop and rap radio station 95.4 Krhyme FM and also appeared in the 2000 movie Boiler Room. Music videos were done for "The Truth" and "Remember Them Days".

Track listing

Charts

Weekly charts

Year-end charts

Singles

References

Beanie Sigel albums
2000 debut albums
Albums produced by Kanye West
Albums produced by Bink (record producer)
Albums produced by Rockwilder
Albums produced by Buckwild
Albums produced by Just Blaze
Def Jam Recordings albums
Roc-A-Fella Records albums